The Gay Old Bird is a 1927 American comedy film directed by Herman C. Raymaker and written by C. Graham Baker and Edward Clark. The film stars Louise Fazenda, John T. Murray, Jane Winton, William Demarest, John Steppling and Frances Raymond. The film was released by Warner Bros. on February 26, 1927.

Cast
Louise Fazenda as Sisseretta Simpkins
John T. Murray as Mr. Cluney
Jane Winton as Mrs. Cluney
William Demarest as Mr. Fixit
John Steppling as Uncle
Frances Raymond as Aunt
Edgar Kennedy as Chauffeur

Box Office
According to Warner Bros records the film earned $140,000 domestically and $44,000 foreign.

References

External links
 

1927 films
1920s English-language films
Silent American comedy films
1927 comedy films
Warner Bros. films
American silent feature films
American black-and-white films
1920s American films